Willem Noorduin (born 21 March 1967, Schiedam) is a Paralympian athlete from Netherlands competing mainly in category F36 shot put and discus events.

Noorduin has competed in 6 Paralympics always in shot put and discus events.  His first appearance was in Barcelona in 1992 where he won the silver medal in the C5 discus.  In 1996 in Atlanta he went musch better winning gold in both shot put and discus.  The 2000 Summer Paralympics in Sydney saw him defend his gold medal in the shot put in the F35 class but only managing bronze in the discus.  2004 saw him win two silvers, this was followed in 2004 by a silver in the discus and a bronze in the shot put.  The 2008 Summer Paralympics in Beijing were the first time Noorduin had been to the Paralympic Games and not won a medal.

References

External links
 profile on paralympic.org

1967 births
Living people
Dutch male discus throwers
Dutch male shot putters
Paralympic athletes of the Netherlands
Athletes (track and field) at the 1988 Summer Paralympics
Athletes (track and field) at the 1992 Summer Paralympics
Athletes (track and field) at the 1996 Summer Paralympics
Athletes (track and field) at the 2000 Summer Paralympics
Athletes (track and field) at the 2004 Summer Paralympics
Athletes (track and field) at the 2008 Summer Paralympics
Paralympic gold medalists for the Netherlands
Paralympic silver medalists for the Netherlands
Paralympic bronze medalists for the Netherlands
Sportspeople from Schiedam
Medalists at the 1988 Summer Paralympics
Medalists at the 1992 Summer Paralympics
Medalists at the 1996 Summer Paralympics
Medalists at the 2000 Summer Paralympics
Medalists at the 2004 Summer Paralympics
Paralympic medalists in athletics (track and field)
20th-century Dutch people
21st-century Dutch people